The 1899 VPI football team represented Virginia Agricultural and Mechanical College and Polytechnic Institute in the 1899 college football season. The team was led by their head coach James Morrison and finished with a record of four wins and one loss (4–1).

Schedule

Season summary

Second game against St. Albans
A second game against St. Albans Lutheran Boys School was scheduled to be played on November 4, 1899 in Radford, Virginia, but it was cancelled due to "an injury to a St. Albans man."

Players
The following players were members of the 1899 football team according to the roster published in the 1903 edition of The Bugle, the Virginia Tech yearbook.

References

VPI
Virginia Tech Hokies football seasons
VPI football